John Duggan may refer to:

 John Duggan (rugby) (born 1929), English former rugby union and rugby league footballer 
 John Duggan (rugby union) (born 1948), Irish former Leicester Tigers winger
 John Duggan (bishop) (1918–2000), Bishop of Tuam, Killala, and Achonry, 1970–1985
 Jack Duggan (politician) (1910–1993), Australian politician for Electoral district of Toowoomba West
 Johnny Duggan (jockey), on racehorse Gold and Black
 John Duggan, main character in the TV series Duggan
 Jack Duggan (ice hockey) (1897–1977), ice hockey player
 Jack Duggan (politician) (1910–1993), member of the Queensland Legislative Assembly
 John Duggan (political scientist) of the Duggan–Schwartz theorem

See also
 John Dugan (disambiguation)